The Perseverance is a pub at 63 Lamb's Conduit Street, Bloomsbury, London WC1, on the corner with Great Ormond Street.

It is a Grade II listed building, built in the early 18th century, and refronted in the early 19th century.

It was The Sun until the 1990s, and after several name changes, became The Perseverance in 2006.

References

External links
 

Grade II listed buildings in the London Borough of Camden
Buildings and structures in Bloomsbury
Grade II listed pubs in London
Pubs in the London Borough of Camden